An institute at Pennsylvania State University ("A Community of Population Scientists at Penn State")
Australian Population Research Institute, Monash University
Population Research Institute (organization) an anti-abortion organization in Front Royal, Virginia, US

See also
:Category:Population research organizations